Criminology & Public Policy is a peer-reviewed academic journal covering criminology and its implications for public policy. It was established in 2001 and is published by John Wiley & Sons on behalf of the American Society of Criminology. The Florida State University College of Criminology and Criminal Justice holds editorship of the journal, and the current editors-in-chief are Cynthia Lum and Christopher Koper. According to the Journal Citation Reports, the journal has a 2020 impact factor of 4.333, ranking it 9th out of 61 journals in the category "Criminology & Penology".

References

External links

Criminology journals
Academic journals associated with learned and professional societies of the United States
Publications established in 2001
English-language journals
Wiley (publisher) academic journals
Triannual journals